The Pilot Range is located in the White Mountains of New Hampshire in the United States.

Summits 
From northeast to southwest, the range's principal summits include:
 Hutchins Mountain (1,137 m / 3,730 ft)
 Mount Cabot (1,268 m / 4,160 ft) *
 The Bulge (1,201 m / 3,940 ft)
 The Horn (1,190 m / 3,905 ft)
 Terrace Mountain (1,114 m / 3,655 ft)
The summits marked with an asterisk (*) are included on the Appalachian Mountain Club's peak-bagging list of "Four-thousand footers" in New Hampshire.

See also
 List of mountains in New Hampshire
 White Mountain National Forest

References

External links 
 PeakBagger.com: Pilot Range

Mountain ranges of New Hampshire
White Mountain National Forest
Landforms of Coös County, New Hampshire